A Perfectly Normal Family is a 2020 Danish drama film directed by Malou Reymann and starring Mikkel Boe Følsgaard, Neel Rønholt, Kaya Toft Loholt and Rigmor Ranthe. The film premiered at the 2020 International Film Festival Rotterdam, before releasing in Denmark on 20 February 2020.

Cast
Mikkel Boe Følsgaard as Thomas / Agnete
Kaya Toft Loholt as Emma
Rigmor Ranthe as Caroline
Neel Rønholt as Helle
Jessica Dinnage as Naja
Hadewych Minis as Petra
Tammi Øst as Vibeke
Kristian Halken as grandfather
Peter Zandersen as Peter
Omar Abdel-Galil as Youssef
Shireen Rasool Elahi Panah as Sofia
Wilfred Schandorff Worsøe as Casper

Reception
The film has  rating on Rotten Tomatoes.  Sophie Monks Kaufman of Empire awarded the film two stars out of five.

Jay Weissberg of Variety gave the film a positive review, calling it "an engagingly sincere picture of good people trying to negotiate barely charted territory to the best of their abilities."

References

External links
 
 

Danish drama films
2020 films
2020 drama films
Danish LGBT-related films
Films about trans women
2020s Danish-language films
2020 LGBT-related films